A polushka (~half [of denga]) was a Russian coin with value equal to  kopeck (100 kopecks = 1 rouble).

Production of polushkas as minted coins began in 1700 under Peter the Great, though more primitive hammered wire money polushkas had been produced for over 150 years before that. Mintage continued, off and on, until 1916, just before the Romanov dynasty ended in 1917.

While coins minted in the 18th century invariably showed the denomination as Polushka, during parts of the 19th and early 20th centuries the denomination was shown as simply ¼ Kopeck.

Dates when Minted

 Peter the Great (1700–1716, 1718–1722)
 Anna Petrovna (1730–1731, 1734–1740)Ivan VI of Russia (1741)
 Elizabeth Petrovna (1743–1751, 1754, 1757–1759)
 Catherine II of Russia (1766–1773, 1775, 1783–1796)
 Paul I of Russia (1797–1800)
 Alexander I of Russia (1803–1805, 1807–1808,1810)
 Nicholas I of Russia (1839–1846, 1849–1855)
 Alexander II of Russia (1855–1881)
 Alexander III of Russia (1881–1894)
 Nicholas II of Russia (1894–1900, 1909–1910, 1915–1916)

See also

 Russian ruble
 Denga
 Kopeck
 Altyn

References

Coins of Russia